The Roman Catholic Diocese of Murang'a is a diocese located in the city of Murang'a in the Ecclesiastical province of Nyeri in Kenya.

History
 March 17, 1983: Established as Diocese of Murang’a from Diocese of Nyeri

Leadership
 Bishops of Murang'a (Roman rite)
 Bishop Peter J. Kairo (17 Mar 1983  – 21 Apr 1997), appointed Bishop of Nakuru
 Bishop Peter Kihara Kariuki, I.M.C. (3 Jun 1999  – 25 Nov 2006), appointed Bishop of Marsabit
 Archbishop John Njue (Apostolic Administrator starting 2006.11) (Cardinal in 2007)
 Bishop James Maria Wainaina [27 Jun 2009 to present]

See also
Roman Catholicism in Kenya

Sources
 GCatholic.org
 Catholic Hierarchy

Roman Catholic dioceses in Kenya
Christian organizations established in 1983
Roman Catholic dioceses and prelatures established in the 20th century
Roman Catholic Ecclesiastical Province of Nyeri